José Patricio Guggiari Corniglione (17 March 1884, in Asunción – 30 October 1957, in Buenos Aires) was a Paraguayan politician by the Partido Liberal Radical Auténtico.

He was President of the Republic of Paraguay between 1928 and 1932. In 1931, after a bloody repression against a demonstration calling for a more vigorous action in defense of the Chaco, he left office to be judged by Parliament. Absolved, he regained the presidency.

Background and Political Life
The records of the Civil Registry indicated that he was from Asunción, born in this capital on March 17, 1884, in the home of the couple Mr. Pedro Guggiari and Mrs. Petrona Corniglione, with Italian and Swiss ancestry. Married to Mrs. Rosa Ramona Rojas, he was the father of María Estela and José Antonio Guggiari Rojas (married to Alejandrina Marasco). She also had Clementina (married to Miguel Peralta).

Delivered by his father to commercial and industrial tasks with members of his family, the little José Patricio is taken to Villarrica del Espiritu Santo, where he will later pick up the persuasive oratories - which made him famous - very evident characteristic of that historic region . There he attended primary school.

He started and completed secondary studies at the Colegio Nacional de la Capital and in 1901 he graduated with a bachelor's degree in science and letters. He immediately begins his university career.

In 1910 he graduated as a doctor in law and social sciences, but his inclination would not be professional but political.

It is worth remembering some tasks prior to his arrival at the first magistracy to expose his capacity for service. On August 8, 1904 is among those who pass to the Argentine shore to discover the liberal conspiracy. On April 30, 1906, he signed the founding charter of the League of Independent Youth, whose original he had until the end of his days. He also hold the positions of Criminal Prosecutor and later as Attorney General of the State between the years 1908 and 1910. Subsequently, he fully incorporates himself into liberalism, which he was to head in 1924.

Deputy, in 1913; President of the Chamber of Deputies in 1918, 1923 and 1924–1927. In the interim he worked as interior minister for Manuel Gondra (1920), being that the pretext for the military uprising. Then deputy again, in 1924.
He assumed the presidency of the Republic on August 15, 1928, from Eligio Ayala.

Presidency
He was the first democratically elected president with free political participation in the history of Paraguay, defeating the candidate of the Asociación Nacional Republicana, Mr. Eduardo Fleitas.

In the Government, he was seconded by Vice President Emiliano González Navero and his Cabinet were made up of Eligio Ayala, Rodolfo González and Justo Pastor Benítez, in the Ministry of Finance; Belisario Rivarola, Luis De Gásperi, Justo Pastor Benítez and Víctor Abente Haedo, in Interior; Rodolfo González, Eladio Velásquez, Justo Pastor Prieto, Justo Pastor Benítez and Alejandro Arce, in Justice, Worship and Public Instruction; Eliseo Da Rosa, Manlio Schenoni and Raúl Casal-Ribeiro, in Guerra y Marina; Gerónimo Zubizarreta and Higinio Arbo, in External Relations.

In 1928, the National Congress of Defense was constituted, with little success, despite the circumstances; in 1929, after arduous debates, the Archdiocese of Asunción was created (which was not intended to be more than an autonomous expression), being named Juan Sinforiano Bogarín as the first archbishop. In 1931 the old town of Ajos was renamed "Coronel Oviedo", in homage to one of its most illustrious sons, who still lived. The respective Schools of Dentistry and Economic Sciences were created, the basis of the Faculties that arrived later. Education, both civilian and military, had not been neglected; in 1929 the Law 1,048 of University Reform was sanctioned, that had been towing since 1926. In 1931 a new plan of studies for the National School is established and the military order the Superior School of War was enabled. Humaitá and Paraguay gunboats were also acquired, which were key during the Chaco War, which began towards the end of his government.

By then there were 810 primary schools, 2,452 teachers and 108,222 students.

Meanwhile, the incipient left was also active from the manifesto of the "New National Ideology" (1929) and from "The Word" (1930), both by the Paraguayan Communist Party, specifying its activity with the occupation of Encarnación and its corresponding proclamation of revolution on February 20, 1931, that failed

23 October massacre

In March of that year, a "military uprising" was conjured up, awarded to the then mayor Rafael Franco. The tragic event that occurred on October 23, left a deep scar not only in the judgment of his government but in the sensitivity of his own person. The protest had originated because President Guggiari decided to keep his movements in the Chaco in secret because it was dangerous to share them with the press because he could alert the adversary, who at the time was Bolivia.

The University Students Center, led by Agustín Ávila, called for a march on the eve, on October 22, 1931, from the Plaza Uruguaya. From there they left for the Palace to demonstrate before the President of the Republic, Dr. José Patricio Guggiari. When they did not find the President, they continued to walk down the streets, without being stopped by the police, and they arrived to his home. Speeches were made and the house was stoned, already in a mob situation. Previously, they had been harangued by then-Major Rafael Franco. The students were, in the end, abruptly dispersed by the police.

The next day, students from the National College and the Normal School were invited to a new demonstration to protest the hostility shown by the police force on the eve. The column of students went through the newsrooms, threw stones at the premises of El Liberal and arrived at the Government Palace, where the President of the Republic was. The mood went on and the crowd ran over the protective police cordon of the Palace, heading to the staircase that led to the presidential office. The situation went out of control and a burst of machine gun left the guard of the Palace and generated mournful scenes. President Guggiari appeared on the balcony, ordering a cease-fire. 
Then, refugee in the Military School, he delegated the presidential command in González Navero and asked the National Congress for his political judgment.
It was the first case of impeachment brought to term in the history of the country.

Those serious events occurred, occasion in which the quota of energy was in charge of the Cnel. Arturo Bray, according to his own memories, Dr. Guggiari requested his trial by Congress, transferring from that date and until January 17, 1932, the first magistracy to the vice president, who was Mr. Emiliano González Navero. The parliament, acquitted him of guilt and punishment. With this he became the first Latin American president to be subjected to a political trial and acquitted of charges.

There is a theory that says that the Paraguayan Communist Party was behind the riots.

Time in Buenos Aires and his last days

With the revolution of February 17, 1936 and the resignation of President Eusebio Ayala, José P., as he was known, leaves Paraguayan territory and remained a time in Clorinda and Formosa, where he receives the alarming news that the president of the Víctor y, Dr. Ayala and the glorious war leader, General José Félix Estigarribia, were detained. Later he moved to Buenos Aires, where he established a residence. He was married to Rosa Rojas. His children accompanied him in exile, especially Maria Stella, who was a nurse in the Chaco War, and who resided in Rosario, Argentina. Her other daughter Clementina was married to Wenceslao Peralta and both settled in La Colmena and the grandchildren: José, Titín, Pedro Bruno, Teresa and Martha. The only son of José P. was named José Antonio.

In Buenos Aires, despite the exile, the sadness and nostalgia, he was permanently surrounded by his compatriots, the great Paraguayan community, and also there he was the undisputed idol of those people and without forgetting the Argentines who also lavished so that José P., felt like in his own country.

In June 1940, during the presidency of General Estigarribia, with the news of the death of his mother, he returned to Paraguay, by train, to Villarrica. He returned to exile during the presidency of General Higinio Morínigo, in September 1940. When, in 1946, President Morínigo took a turn for democracy, an amnesty for all Paraguayans, the return of José P., on August 14 was memorable. Day of sun and lapachos with beautiful flowers. There had never been a comparable crowd, surpassing in quantity, the visits years after two American leaders: Juan Domingo Perón and Getulio Vargas.

The happy days of the democratic spring lasted only 6 months and returned to exile and there for many years, until his death on October 29, 1957.

"The pride of being a liberal is only overcome by the honor of being Paraguayan", famous phrase of the liberal politician.

References

1884 births
1957 deaths
People from Asunción
Paraguayan people of Italian descent
Paraguayan people of Swiss descent
Presidents of Paraguay
20th-century Paraguayan lawyers
Paraguayan expatriates in Argentina
Government ministers of Paraguay
Presidents of the Chamber of Deputies of Paraguay
People of Swiss-Italian descent
Liberal Party (Paraguay) politicians
Universidad Nacional de Asunción alumni